The name Ctesippus may also refer to a character in Plato's Euthydemus and Lysis, and to a historical figure, see Leptines and Against Leptines.

In Greek mythology, the name Ctesippus (Ancient Greek: Κτήσιππος means 'possessing horses') may refer to:

Ctessipus, son of Heracles by Deianira. He was the father of Thrasyanor, grandfather of Antimachus and great-grandfather of Deiphontes. Thersander, son of Agamedidas, is also given as his great-grandson.
Ctesippus, another son of Heracles by Astydameia the daughter of Amyntor or Ormenius.
Ctessipus, two of the suitors of Penelope, one from Same, and the other from Ithaca. The rich and "lawless" Ctesippus of Same, son of Polytherses, who has 'fabulous wealth' appears in the Odyssey; he mocks the disguised Odysseus and hurls a bull's hoof at him as a 'gift', mocking xenia, though Odysseus dodges this. Telemachus says if he had hit the guest, he would have run Ctesippus through with his spear. Later, in the battle between Odysseus and the suitors, Ctesippus attempts to kill Eumaeus with a spear, but misses due to Athena's intervention, though scratches Eumaeus's shoulder, and is thereupon himself killed by Philoetius, who thus avenges the disrespect towards his master.

Notes

References 

 Apollodorus, The Library with an English Translation by Sir James George Frazer, F.B.A., F.R.S. in 2 Volumes, Cambridge, MA, Harvard University Press; London, William Heinemann Ltd. 1921. ISBN 0-674-99135-4. Online version at the Perseus Digital Library. Greek text available from the same website.
Diodorus Siculus, The Library of History translated by Charles Henry Oldfather. Twelve volumes. Loeb Classical Library. Cambridge, Massachusetts: Harvard University Press; London: William Heinemann, Ltd. 1989. Vol. 3. Books 4.59–8. Online version at Bill Thayer's Web Site
 Diodorus Siculus, Bibliotheca Historica. Vol 1-2. Immanel Bekker. Ludwig Dindorf. Friedrich Vogel. in aedibus B. G. Teubneri. Leipzig. 1888–1890. Greek text available at the Perseus Digital Library.
 Homer, The Odyssey with an English Translation by A.T. Murray, PH.D. in two volumes. Cambridge, MA., Harvard University Press; London, William Heinemann, Ltd. 1919. . Online version at the Perseus Digital Library. Greek text available from the same website.
 Pausanias, Description of Greece with an English Translation by W.H.S. Jones, Litt.D., and H.A. Ormerod, M.A., in 4 Volumes. Cambridge, MA, Harvard University Press; London, William Heinemann Ltd. 1918. . Online version at the Perseus Digital Library
Pausanias, Graeciae Descriptio. 3 vols. Leipzig, Teubner. 1903.  Greek text available at the Perseus Digital Library.

Heracleidae
Children of Heracles
Characters in the Odyssey
Ithacan characters in Greek mythology